Stadion Neufeld is a multi-use stadium in Bern, Switzerland. It is the home ground of FC Bern and the junior team of BSC Young Boys. The capacity of the stadium is 14,000 spectators, including 3000 seats.

BSC Young Boys used the stadium from 2001/02 to 2004/05, during the construction of Stade de Suisse. It would also host the 1954 European Championships in Athletics.

See also 
List of football stadiums in Switzerland

References

External links 
 Stadium information
 FC Bern: Stadion Neufeld 
 Stadion Neufeld 

Neufeld
Neufeld
Buildings and structures in Bern
Sports venues in the Canton of Bern
Sports venues completed in 1924
1924 establishments in Switzerland
20th-century architecture in Switzerland